A dagger, obelisk, or obelus  is a typographical mark that usually indicates a footnote if an asterisk has already been used. The symbol is also used to indicate death (of people) or extinction (of species). It is one of the modern descendants of  the obelus, a mark used historically by scholars as a critical or highlighting indicator in manuscripts.

A double dagger or diesis  is a variant with two handles that usually marks a third footnote after the asterisk and dagger.

The triple dagger  is a variant with three handles and is used by medievalists to indicate another level of notation.

History

The dagger symbol originated from a variant of the obelus, originally depicted by a plain line  or a line with one or two dots . It represented an iron roasting spit, a dart, or the  sharp end of a javelin, symbolizing the skewering or cutting out of dubious matter.

The obelus is believed to have been invented by the Homeric scholar Zenodotus as one of a system of editorial symbols. They marked questionable or corrupt words or passages in manuscripts of the Homeric epics.

While the asterisk (asteriscus) was used for corrective additions, the obelus was used for corrective deletions of invalid reconstructions. It was used when non-attested words are reconstructed for the sake of argument only, implying that the author did not believe such a word or word form had ever existed. Some scholars used the obelus and various other critical symbols, in conjunction with a second symbol known as the metobelos ("end of obelus"), variously represented as two vertically arranged dots, a -like symbol, a mallet-like symbol, or a diagonal slash (with or without one or two dots). They indicated the end of a marked passage.

It was used much in the same way by later scholars to mark differences between various translations or versions of the Bible and other manuscripts. The early Christian Alexandrian scholar Origen (c. 184–253 AD) used it to indicate differences between different versions of the Old Testament in his Hexapla. Epiphanius of Salamis (c. 310–320 – 403) used both a horizontal slash or hook (with or without dots) and an upright and slightly slanting dagger to represent an obelus. St. Jerome (c. 347–420) used a simple horizontal slash for an obelus, but only for passages in the Old Testament. He describes the use of the asterisk and the dagger as: "an asterisk makes a light shine, the obelisk cuts and pierces".

Isidore of Seville (c. 560–636) described the use of the symbol as follows: "The obelus is appended to words or phrases uselessly repeated, or else where the passage involves a false reading, so that, like the arrow, it lays low the superfluous and makes the errors disappear ... The obelus accompanied by points is used when we do not know whether a passage should be suppressed or not."

Medieval scribes used the symbols extensively for critical markings of manuscripts. In addition to this, the dagger was also used in notations in early Christianity, to indicate a minor intermediate pause in the chanting of Psalms, equivalent to the quaver rest notation or the trope symbol in Hebrew cantillation. It also indicates a breath mark when reciting, along with the asterisk, and is thus frequently seen beside a comma.

In the 16th century, the printer and scholar Robert Estienne (also known as Stephanus in Latin and Stephens in English) used it to mark differences in the words or passages between different printed versions of the Greek New Testament  (Textus Receptus).

Due to the variations as to the different uses of the different forms of the obelus, there is some controversy as to which symbols can actually be considered an obelus. The term 'obelus' may have referred strictly only to the horizontal slash and the dagger symbols.

Modern usage 
The dagger usually indicates a footnote if an asterisk has already been used. A third footnote employs the double dagger. Additional footnotes are somewhat inconsistent and represented by a variety of symbols, e.g., parallels, section sign , and the pilcrow  some of which were nonexistent in early modern typography. Partly because of this, superscript numerals have increasingly been used in modern literature in the place of these symbols, especially when several footnotes are required. Some texts use asterisks and daggers alongside superscripts, using the former for per-page footnotes and the latter for endnotes.

The dagger is also used to indicate death, extinction, or obsolescence. The asterisk and the dagger, when placed beside years, indicate year of birth and year of death respectively. This usage is particularly common in German. When placed immediately before or after a person's name, the dagger indicates that the person is deceased. In this usage, it is referred to as the "death dagger". In the Oxford English Dictionary, the dagger symbol indicates an obsolete word.
The asteroid 37 Fides, the last asteroid to be assigned an astronomical symbol before the practice faded, was assigned the dagger.
In Anglican chant pointing, the dagger indicates a verse to be sung to the second part of the chant.
In some early printed Bible translations, a dagger or double dagger indicates that a literal translation of a word or phrase is to be found in the margin. 
In biology, the dagger next to a taxon name indicates that the taxon is extinct.
In library cataloging, a double dagger delimits MARC subfields.
In chess notation, the dagger may be suffixed to a move to signify the move resulted in a check, and a double dagger denotes checkmate.
In chemistry, the double dagger is used in chemical kinetics to indicate a transition state species.
On a cricket scorecard or team list, the dagger indicates the team's wicket-keeper.
In genealogy, the dagger is used traditionally to mark a death in genealogical records.
In linguistics, the dagger placed after a language name indicates an extinct language.
Some logicians use the dagger as an affirmation ('it is true that ...') operator.
The palochka is transliterated to a double dagger ib the ISO 9 standard for converting Cyrillic to Latin
In psychological statistics the dagger indicates that a difference between two figures is not significant to a p<0.05 level, however is still considered a "trend" or worthy of note. Commonly this will be used for a p-value between 0.1 and 0.05.
In mathematics and, more often, physics, a dagger denotes the Hermitian adjoint of an operator; for example, A† denotes the adjoint of A.  This notation is sometimes replaced with an asterisk, especially in mathematics.  An operator is said to be Hermitian if A† = A.
In philology,  the dagger indicates an obsolete form of a word or phrase.
In textual criticism and in some editions of works written before the invention of printing, daggers enclose text that is believed not to be original.

While daggers are freely used in English-language texts, they are often avoided in other languages because of their similarity to the Christian cross.  In German, for example, daggers are commonly employed only to indicate a person's death or the extinction of a word, language, species or the like.

Encoding

 – used in Alexander John Ellis's "palaeotype" transliteration to indicate retracted pronunciation
 – used in Alexander John Ellis's "palaeotype" transliteration to indicate advanced pronunciation
 – used in Alexander John Ellis's "palaeotype" transliteration to indicate retroflex pronunciation
 – A variant with three handles.

Typing the character 

Single dagger:
 In HTML: 
 Windows: 
 MacOS: 
 Linux: it appears there is no compose key sequence, but you can type 

Double dagger:
 In HTML: 
 Windows: 
 MacOS: 
 Linux:

Visually similar symbols

See also

References

Punctuation
Typographical symbols
Ancient Greek punctuation